The State Register of Heritage Places is maintained by the Heritage Council of Western Australia. , 92 places are heritage-listed in the Shire of Wagin, of which eight are on the State Register of Heritage Places.

List

State Register of Heritage Places
The Western Australian State Register of Heritage Places, lists the following eight state registered places within the Shire of Wagin:

Shire of Wagin heritage-listed places
The following places are heritage listed in the Shire of Wagin but are not State registered:

References

Wagin
Wagin